Stamped may refer to:

Stamped (application), an iPhone app 
Stamped (song), by The Verve
Stamped from the Beginning, a book by Ibram X. Kendi

See also
Stmpd Rcrds, a Dutch record label
Stamp (disambiguation)